Ladorudzek  is a village in the administrative district of Gmina Grzegorzew, within Koło County, Greater Poland Voivodeship, in west-central Poland.

References

Ladorudzek